The Houtong Coal Mine Ecological Park is a former coal mine in Ruifang District, New Taipei, Taiwan.

History
The park used to be a coal mine in the region.

Architecture
The park consists of various buildings built during the Japanese rule and coal-related structures, such as coal transportation bridge, coal preparation plant, historical trail etc.

Transportation
The park is accessible within walking distance from Houtong Station of Taiwan Railways.

See also
 Mining in Taiwan

References

Buildings and structures in New Taipei
Former coal mines in Taiwan
Tourist attractions in New Taipei